George Barrow may refer to:
George Barrow (geologist) (1853–1932), British geologist
Sir George Barrow, 2nd Baronet (1806–1876), English civil servant
George Barrow (Indian Army officer) (1864–1959), British general
George Barrow (musician) (1921–2013), American jazz saxophonist
George Lennox Barrow (1921–1989), Irish historian and colonial administrator
George L. Barrow (1851–1925), Australian journalist

See also
George Barrows (1914–1994), American actor
George Barrows (politician), American politician from Maine